The 1934 Moroccan Grand Prix (also known as the 1934 Anfa Grand Prix or the 1934 Casablanca Grand Prix) was a Grand Prix that was held on 20 May 1934 at the street circuit in Anfa, a suburb of Casablanca, Morocco.
The race, contested over 60 laps of 6.37 km (3.96 mi), was won by Louis Chiron driving an Alfa Romeo Tipo B after starting from second position.

Entries

Grid positions

Race report
Soon in the race Chiron took over the lead from Lehoux, who later got into a long fight with Philippe Étancelin for second position. Comotti, Straight and Hamilton were fighting for fourth position. When Lehoux's tyre blew he had to make multiple extra pitstops, which made him fall back in the field. Teammates Straight and Hamilton also struck tyre trouble and at the end of the race Hamilton had to retire with a leaking fuel tank. Lehoux fought back to third position finishing behind Étancelin. Chiron, driving an Alfa Romeo Tipo B, completed the required 60 laps the fastest and took victory.

Race results

References

Other sources
 Racing Sports Cars (The page of each aforementioned driver was consulted.)
 Driver Database (The page of each aforementioned driver was consulted.)
 The Golden Era of Grand Prix Racing - Drivers (The page of each aforementioned driver was consulted.)

Moroccan Grand Prix
Moroccan Grand Prix
1934 in Morocco